Steve Watson (born 1974) is an English football manager and former player.

Steve or Stephen Watson may also refer to:

Steve Watson (actor) (born 1972), actor and TV presenter
Steve Watson (athletic director), director of athletics for Loyola University Chicago
Steve Watson (linebacker) (born 1982), American football player
Steve Watson (wide receiver) (born 1957), American football player
Stephen Watson (footballer) (born 1973), footballer for Rangers and St Mirren
Stephen Watson (poet) (1954–2011), South African poet
Stephen Watson (racing driver) (born 1974), South African racing driver
Stephen H. Watson (born 1951), American philosopher
Stephen John Watson (1898–1976), British agriculturalist
S. J. Watson, English writer

See also
John Steven Watson (1916–1986), English historian who served as Principal of the University of St Andrews from 1966–86
Steven Watson (author) (born 1947), American writer and filmmaker